Hamar Municipality is a municipality in Innlandet county, Norway. It is located in the traditional district of Hedemarken. The administrative centre of the municipality is the town of Hamar. Other settlements in Hamar include Hjellum, Slemsrud, Ridabu, Ingeberg, and Ilseng.

The  municipality is the 250th largest by area out of the 356 municipalities in Norway. Hamar is the 32nd most populous municipality in Norway with a population of 31,999.

Among the municipality's responsibilities, it the operation of nine primary and three lower secondary school, with a combined 3,115 pupils. The municipality also owns the power company Hamar Energi, and the sports venues Briskeby Arena, Vikingskipet and Hamar Olympic Amphitheatre.

General information
This newly designated "town" (population: 1,025) was separated from the municipality of Vang to and established as a separate municipality in 1849. In 1946, a large area in Vang that surrounded the town of Hamar (population: 4,087) was transferred out of Vang and into Hamar. The next year in 1947, part of the municipality of Furnes (population: 821) was transferred into Hamar. On 1 January 1965, a part of Ringsaker (population: 100) was transferred to Hamar. On 1 January 1992, the municipality of Vang (population: 9,103) was merged with the town of Hamar (population: 16,351) and parts of the Stensby, Hanstad, Viker, and Stammerud areas of Ringsaker (population: 224) to form a new, larger Hamar Municipality.

Name
The municipality (originally the town) is named after the old  farm. The medieval market was first built on this farm and that market eventually became a kjøpstad which in turn became a self-governing municipality. The name is identical with the word hamarr which means "rocky hill".

Coat of arms
The coat of arms were granted on 2 June 1896. The arms show a Black Grouse sitting in the top of a pine tree on a white background. An older version of the arms had been used for a long time. The old version was first described in the anonymous Hamar Chronicle, written in 1553.

Churches
The Church of Norway has two parishes within the municipality of Hamar. It is part of the Hamar domprosti (arch-deanery) in the Diocese of Hamar.

Geography

The municipality of Hamar lies along the eastern shore of the large lake Mjøsa. The rivers Flakstadelva, Lageråa, and Svartelva run through the municipality. The municipality lies to the east of Ringsaker Municipality, to the south of Åmot Municipality, to the west of Løten Municipality, and to the north of Stange Municipality.

Climate
Hamar has a humid continental climate (Dfb) with fairly dry and cold winters, and comfortably warm summers. The all-time high  was recorded in July 2018, which was the warmest month on record with average daily high  and mean . The all-time low  is from in December 2010, which was a very cold month with mean  and average daily low . A previous weather station (Hamar I, at an elevation of 139 m) recorded the coldest month on record with mean  in January 1917. In August 1975, the weather station "Staur Forsøksgård" in nearby Stange recorded .

Government
All municipalities in Norway, including Hamar, are responsible for primary education (through 10th grade), outpatient health services, senior citizen services, unemployment and other social services, zoning, economic development, and municipal roads. The municipality is governed by a municipal council of elected representatives, which in turn elects a mayor.  The municipality falls under the Østre Innlandet District Court and the Eidsivating Court of Appeal.

Municipal council
The municipal council  of Hamar is made up of 39 representatives that are elected to four year terms. The party breakdown of the council is as follows:

Mayors
The mayors of Hamar (incomplete list):
1946-1967: Erling Audensen (Ap)
1968-1975: Kristian Birger Gundersen (Ap)
1975-1991: Egil Oddvar Larsen (Ap)
1992-1999: Odd Aspeli (Ap)
1999-2011: Einar Busterud (LL)
2011-2015: Morten Aspeli (Ap)
2015–present: Einar Busterud (LL)

Transportation
The town of Hamar is an important railway junction between two different railway lines going to Trondheim. The Rørosbanen railway line (the older line) leaves Hamar and heads northeast towards Røros. The main Dovrebanen railway line also heads north, but further west of the other line. Both lines stop at Hamar Station. The Norwegian Railway Museum (Norsk Jernbanemuseum) is also in Hamar. Hamar Airport, Stafsberg serves general aviation out of Hamar. The European route E6 highway and the Norwegian National Road 3 both cross through the municipality.

References

External links

Municipal fact sheet from Statistics Norway 

 
Municipalities of Innlandet
1849 establishments in Norway